Babushaan (born 30 July 1989 as Tanmay Mohanty) is an Indian actor and playback singer who predominantly works in Odia movies. He debuted in Ollywood through Romeo – The Lover Boy in (2009) directed by Hara Patnaik.

Early life
Babushaan was born as Tanmay Mohanty on 30 July 1989 in Bhubaneswar, Odisha, India to actors Uttam Mohanty and Aparajita Mohanty.

Career 
Mohanty debuted in Odia film industry through Romeo - The Lover Boy directed by Hara Patnaik opposite actress Lovely. Both his parents played the role of his father and mother in the movie.

In 2015, he starred in the successful films Jie Jaha Kahu Mora Dho, Super Michhua and Bhala Pae Tate 100 Ru 100.

In 2022, he played the role of a doctor in the movie DAMaN, which acclaimed a good reaction from the audience. Earlier in this year, his another movie, Bidyarana released in theaters during Ratha Jatra, where he shared the screen with Shivani Sangita, Soma Bhoumick, Pupul Bhuyan.

Production Company 
He started his production company in 2017 and Sunapila Tike Screw Dhila was the movie in this production. In 2023, he produced Phalguna Chaitra with Shakti Jagdev.

Filmography

Film

Discography

Non-film songs

References

External links

 
 
Babushan Mohanty Biography In Odia
Babushaan Mohanty Website

1989 births
Living people
Indian male film actors
Male actors in Odia cinema
21st-century Indian male actors
Kalinga Institute of Industrial Technology alumni